Level II is the fourth album by R&B group, Blackstreet, released on March 11, 2003. It was their first and only album released on record label DreamWorks Records. The album's title was a reference to its members' best known line-up during their most successful album, 1996's Another Level. Two of the members returned for the recording of Level II. Mark Middleton returned to the fold after he was replaced by Terrell Phillips on 1999's Finally to launch a gospel music career. Dave Hollister returned on the song "Bygones", as he also left the group to start his solo career.

Founding members Teddy Riley and Chauncey Hannibal patched things up to record Level II. A few years earlier, they were involved in a very public dispute that signaled the group's demise at the end of 1999. After Blackstreet's eventual dissolution, Riley entered into a short-lived reunion with his previous group Guy.  Hannibal attempted a solo career, while Eric Williams returned to writing and producing for other artists such as Dave Hollister, Donell Jones and Jaheim.

Riley also attempted a solo career as well, with a deal with Virgin Records in 2000. His solo recording Black Rock was shelved despite promotional copies of the album being issued. Another project that he worked on was the Capitol Records singer Michael "Mike E." Etheridge, a former member of The Neptunes.  His debut album Master Plan- which was  executive produced by Riley- was also shelved, and as a result, several songs on the unreleased albums made their way on Level II. "Look In The Water" was originally recorded by Mike E. for his album, but Riley re-recorded the song with Blackstreet's vocals. Several songs from Riley's unreleased album Black Rock ("Friend Of Mine", "You Made Me", "Deep" and "Bygones") were also re-recorded for this album.  Level II was released with little to no promotion, as DreamWorks Records was on the verge of being absorbed by their previous label Interscope Records.

The artwork for the edited version has the logo colored blue as opposed to the red color on the uncut version.

Track listing

Samples
 "Ticket To Ride" contains a sample of "Earth, Wind & Fire", as performed by Earth, Wind & Fire
 "Don't Touch" contains a sample of "Brick House", as performed by Commodores
 "She's Hot" contains an interpolation of "Warning", as performed by The Notorious B.I.G.
 "Ooh Girl" contains an interpolation of "Ooh Boy", as performed by Rose Royce
 "It's So Hard To Say Goodbye" contains a sample of "My Love", as performed by Gene Chandler
 "Why, Why" contains an interpolation of "Human Nature", as performed by Michael Jackson
 "Look In The Water" contains a sample of "Holding Back the Years", as performed by Simply Red

Personnel
 Teddy Riley, Jean-Marie Horvat - recording engineers, mixing
 Brian Turner, Jim Quarles - assistant engineers
 David Campbell - string arrangements & conducting
 Tony Dawsey - mastering
 Joseph Cultice - photography
 D.L. Warfield - art direction, design

References

External links

Blackstreet albums
2003 albums
DreamWorks Records albums